Maldives national day (also known as Qaumee (national) Dhuvas (day) in Dhivehi), is an important day, as it is observed to celebrate the victory of Muhammad Thakurufaanu Al Auzam over the Portuguese occupation in the year 1573. According to the Islamic calendar, the National Day of Maldives falls on the 1st of Rabee ul Awwal, the third month of Hijri (Islamic) calendar.

In the year 1558, Portuguese colonial power attacked Maldives and beheaded random people on the street and the sultan and established its colonial rule. It was later in 1573; Muhammad Thakurufaanu arrived the capital Male` along with his companions and succeeded in ending the fifteen-year colonial rule of the Portuguese. Since then, 1st of Rabee ul Awwal each Islamic year is marked as a National Day of the Republic of Maldives. 
Celebrations of the day include parades, color festivals and route marches on the streets of Male, and in islands.

See also
Muhammad Thakurufaanu Al Auzam

References

Annual events in the Maldives
Observances set by the Islamic calendar
National days